Lockhart is a census-designated place in Orange County, Florida, United States. The population was 13,060 at the 2010 census. It is part of the Orlando–Kissimmee–Sanford, Florida Metropolitan Statistical Area. The community is named for David Lockhart (19 March 1864 - 26 August 1923).

Geography
Lockhart is located at  (28.625327, -81.436910).

According to the United States Census Bureau, the CDP has a total area of 11.8 km (4.6 mi2), of which 11.3 km (4.4 mi2) is land and 0.5 km (0.2 mi2) (4.17%) is water.

Demographics

At the 2000 census, there were 12,944 people, 4,642 households and 3,305 families living in the CDP. The population density was 1,143.6/km (2,963.6/mi2). There were 4,952 housing units at an average density of 437.5/km (1,133.8/mi2). The racial makeup of the CDP was 73.79% White, 16.08% African American, 0.58% Native American, 2.21% Asian, 0.04% Pacific Islander, 4.21% from other races, and 3.09% from two or more races. Hispanic or Latino of any race were 16.09% of the population.

There were 4,642 households, of which 37.9% had children under the age of 18 living with them, 49.3% were married couples living together, 16.0% had a female householder with no husband present, and 28.8% were non-families. 20.1% of all households were made up of individuals, and 5.2% had someone living alone who was 65 years of age or older. The average household size was 2.79 and the average family size was 3.20.

Age distribution was 29.2% under the age of 18, 8.8% from 18 to 24, 34.1% from 25 to 44, 19.6% from 45 to 64, and 8.3% who were 65 years of age or older. The median age was 33 years. For every 100 females, there were 98.4 males. For every 100 females age 18 and over, there were 94.9 males.

The median household income was $38,169, and the median family income was $39,786. Males had a median income of $30,337 versus $24,006 for females. The per capita income for the CDP was $16,593. About 8.9% of families and 11.3% of the population were below the poverty line, including 15.9% of those under age 18 and 9.1% of those age 65 or over.

References

Census-designated places in Orange County, Florida
Greater Orlando
Census-designated places in Florida